Inca is a town on the Spanish island of Mallorca. The population of the municipality is 32,137 (2018) in an area of 58.4 km². 

There is a junction station Mallorca rail network with trains to Palma, the island's capital, to Sa Pobla, and to Manacor. 

Inca is home of the footwear company "Camper".

Inca is known for its wine cellars. The town, like its neighboring municipality Binissalem, was a mass producer of wine from the 17th to 19th centuries when phylloxera destroyed the industry and its inhabitants turned to other activities such as tanning and leather craftsmanship. Many old wine cellars are being used as restaurants for serving traditional Mallorcan dishes like sopes mallorquines, tombet and gató d'ametlles.

Sister cities
Inca has two sister cities

  Lompoc, California, United States of America
  Telpaneca, Nicaragua

References

External links 
 Inca, Mallorca, tourist information and guide
 Jewish quarter
 Inca Hospital Center
 Rail Station
 Sport Center Inca
 Can Monroig